Zangenberg may refer to:
 Zangenberg, a division of the town Zeitz in Saxony-Anhalt, Germany
 European family name, at least dating back to the early 15th century.
Persons:
 Christian Zangenberg, Danish royal actor, 27 September 1853 – 20 April 1914
 Julie Zangenberg, Danish actress
 Einar Zangenberg, Danish actor, 22 December 1882 – 24 October 1918
 Jan Zangenberg, Danish actor, 23 April 1927 – 5 August 1992, founded several Danish theatres during the 1960s
 Georg von Zangenberg, son of Duke Henrich IV of Bavaria-Landshut, born 1386